The Devil's Cargo is a 1925 American silent drama film produced by Famous Players-Lasky and distributed by Paramount Pictures. It was directed by Victor Fleming and starred Wallace Beery and Pauline Starke. It is based on an original story for the screen.

Plot
As described in a review in a film magazine, John Joyce (Collier), newly arrived in Sacramento during the California Gold Rush to edit a newspaper, arrays himself with the Vigilantes. He is one of the most eager in his demand that the mining camp characters expelled to make the capital what he thinks it should be. Then he meets Faro Sampson (Starke) and falls in love, thinking her to be a daughter of a minister. When he discovers that she is the daughter of a gambler and the chief attraction of his den, he spurns her. However, when she comes calling, he meekly returns at her call, and is placed in a compromising situation. He is evicted along with all the people he had denounced, and his sister Martha (Adams) is carried along on the same boat. Vigilantes refuse the crowd to disembark, but they force their way ashore until the bursting of the boiler on the boat sends it adrift with a few men and women still onboard. Ben (Beery), a fireman, assumes command by virtue that he has the captain's cap and by his strength. When he seeks to make Martha his victim, Joyce is galvanized to action to save his sister.  A fight ensues and Ben is overpowered by a blow to his head from a skylight. Demoted to the scullion on the rescue ship, Ben is relegated to paring potatoes while Joyce and Faro find happiness.

Cast

Preservation
The Library of Congress catalog and film archives do not show any listings for the film. However, the silentera.com site and an online dvd retailer list the film as available for sale.

References

External links

1925 films
American black-and-white films
American silent feature films
1925 drama films
Films directed by Victor Fleming
Lost American films
Silent American drama films
1925 lost films
Lost drama films
1920s American films